Frank Erne (January 8, 1875 – September 17, 1954) was a Swiss-born American boxer widely credited with taking the World Featherweight Championship on November 27, 1896, from George Dixon in New York City, as well as the World Lightweight Championship from George "Kid" Lavigne on July 3, 1899, in Buffalo, New York. Late in his career he would contend for the World Welterweight Title against Rube Ferns. Erne was posthumously inducted into the International Boxing Hall of Fame in the class of 2020.

Early life and boxing career
Erne was born on January 8, 1875, in Döttingen, Switzerland, to a family of Swiss descent. His father once kept a vineyard near Zurich when he was a child, and after gaining success as a boxer in America, Frank purchased one for his father in New York. Not surprisingly, Frank took wine with his meals for much of his life, including the period he reigned as a world feather and lightweight champion.

At the age of seven he emigrated to the United States with his family.  According to one source, in the early 1890s he worked setting pins in a bowling alley at the Buffalo Athletic Club where he began his training. During his career as a boxer, he worked as a manager of boxing classes, and physical culture schools.

Erne most prized his skills as a great strategist and "scientific boxer" rather than a strong puncher, and although his BoxRec record impressively shows 14 of 30 of his better publicized fights ending by knockout, few appear to be in early rounds.  Apparently he could land a punch against a less skilled opponent when necessary, but he assigned greater value to what was known in his era as "ring generalship."  Erne's favorite punch was a right to the chin, similar to an uppercut, after another boxer led with a left.  Erne once told the Pittsburgh Press in an interview, "The majority of present day fighters are not ring generals, because they really are never called upon in a ten round bout to show ring generalship. But in the old days a fighter who wasn't a ring general never amounted to much and didn't last very long." Erne went on to note that it was the fighters with brains and not brawn who achieved the most during his boxing career.

Erne began to fight professionally by October 27, 1892, when he defeated John Roy at the Buffalo Athletic Club in New York in a fourth-round knockout, showing that he was not a boxer who lacked punching ability when the opportunity arose.  The fight was billed as the Featherweight Championship of Western New York and paid the winner the princely sum of $250 according to the Buffalo Courier. Erne had defeated Roy by TKO one month earlier in Buffalo.

Erne first met World Featherweight Champion George Dixon in a ten-round draw on December 5, 1895, at the Manhattan Athletic Club in New York City.  Two weeks later he fought well known Australian boxer "Young Griffo", an 1890 Featherweight World Champion, at the Music Hall in Buffalo.  According to the New York Sun, Griffo, to the frustration of the crowd, dominated the brief four-round draw from the start and neither boxer put much effort into the fight.

Winning the Featherweight World Title
Erne took the World Featherweight Title from Canadian born American Black boxer George Dixon on November 27, 1896, at the Broadway Athletic Club in New York in a twenty-round points decision, though Dixon was reluctant to acknowledge his loss of the championship.  Though outweighing him by nine pounds, he lost the title to Dixon in a twenty-round points decision in Brooklyn on March 24, 1897, having held it only four months.

Winning the Lightweight World Title

Already nearing the featherweight maximum after his loss of the title to George Dixon, Erne began fighting in the lightweight division, meeting George "Kid" Lavigne for his first Lightweight Title bout on September 28, 1898, in Brooklyn.  The twenty-round draw would not determine a new champion.

In one of the most important bouts of his career, he took the world lightweight title from Kid Lavigne on July 3, 1899, in a twenty-round points decision before an enthusiastic home crowd in Buffalo. Looking back on Erne's critical win twenty years earlier, the St. Petersburg Times noted that Erne was more known for his speed and scientific skills than power, recalling that Lavigne had lost the title to "lighthitting Frank Erne." This description of Erne was more accurate when he faced his most gifted opponents.

In a fight that some historians consider a greater show of skill than his two championship title wins, he successfully defended the lightweight title at New York's Broadway Athletic Club in a close bout against the incomparable lightweight Joe Gans on March 23, 1900.  According to BoxRec, Gans had asked the fight to be stopped in the ninth round after being injured by an accidental headbutt from Erne. Other sources wrote that Erne had held a decisive edge in the bout, and continuously battered Gans in the face, before Gans finally ended the fight fearing permanent damage to his eye.  No headbutt was mentioned in their account.

On July 16, 1900, Erne faced lightweight legend Terry McGovern in Madison Square Garden in New York. Erne had superior reach and height over McGovern, but according to most boxing writers, had not demonstrated the ability to consistently connect with the power of McGovern.  Erne's ring generalship with his best opponents, was a slow, and deliberate strategy which took longer to end a fight.  As the Bridgeport Herald wrote before the fight, "Erne's fights have been longer than Terry's as his record shows. He is not the finisher that Terry is. He is a point decision fighter more properly speaking and McGovern is a knockerout." Though putting McGovern down in the first round, Erne was down three times in the third before his cornermen ended the fight.

Rib injury in the Gardner bout
In a successful lightweight title defense, Erne met Curley Supples on March 17, 1902, in Ontario, winning by a sixth-round knockout.  On March 21, 1902, according to the Pittsburg Press, he met Gus Gardner at the Wabash Club in Chicago. Showing amazing resiliency and determination for a non-title fight, he won a six-round victory on points, after breaking two ribs in the fourth round from a well placed right by Gardner.  The article noted that Erne had received this diagnosis from a Doctor who examined him, and that he considered cancelling his bout with Gans.  Possibly affecting his ability to move with fluid speed in the ring, his bruised abdomen may have contributed to his losing his title to Gans only two months later.

Loss of the lightweight title to Gans
On May 12, 1902, he lost the title in his bout with Gans Gans in a stunning first-round knockout, in Ontario. Gans knocked Erne to the mat early in the fight, from a strong blow. The Evening Telegram wrote of the bout, "never did the sporting world get such a shock.  Frank Erne--most clever of all fighting men--knocked out in a single punch by a man he had whipped before..." They went on to note that "Many of the spectators didn't even see the blow struck." Gans was twenty-seven, not thirty-five, for he was thirty-five when he died in 1910, because he was born in 1874, only a year before Erne.(Joe Gans by Colleen Aycock and Mark Scott.)
. Erne had defended the title against New York Jack O'Brien, a talented contender on December 4, 1899.  Tellingly, in the O'Brien fight, Erne had been down in both the third and ninth rounds.

On June 24, 1902, Erne defeated Jim Malone of London, England in the seventh round.  The bout was billed as the 138-pound "White" World Championship.  Erne had no difficult defeating Malone, and some sources noted he had not trained extensively for the bout. The fight ended when Erne landed one of his favored punches, a solid left to Malone's jaw resulting in a knockout.

Contending for the World Welterweight Championship
On September 23, 1901, in Ontario, Ernie lost a shot at the World Welterweight Championship to reigning champion Rube Ferns, in a ninth-round knockout in Ontario, Canada.  The Toronto Star estimated that 45,000 fans watched the fight, with the Ontario club at full capacity. In a rare display of competitiveness, Erne had fought as a contender in three separate weight divisions, winning the world title twice.

Late boxing career and legacy
As a skilled strategist, Erne was not accustomed to taking much punishment in his bouts and after receiving a seventh-round knockout from a skilled, 23-year-old firebrand Jimmy Brit on November 26, 1902, at the Mechanics Pavilion in San Francisco, he considered retirement at 27.  He admitted he had been "knocked completely out," by the "game young fellow," and noted "I would advise no young man to follow the ring for a living. I have quit for good and I am glad to do so."

Boxing in Paris

Despite his proclamation, Erne would continue to train intermittently, and did not retire from the ring until accepting a bout with Curley Watson in Paris for what was billed as the "Welterweight Championship of France." Showing his skills, Erne won the bout on February 29, 1908, in a ten-round points decision, but retired not long after at 33.

Death in New York
Erne died on September 17, 1954, in New York, living nearly to eighty. Perhaps his longevity could partially be attributed to his fighting a limited number of fights for a champion and nearly retiring before he reached thirty.  According to the Pittsburgh Post-Gazette, Erne did not fully retire from boxing until 1908, but he may have helped with the training or management of other boxers after that date.  The Gazette noted that "he never received a scar or blemish from his many fights", perhaps a result of noteworthy defensive skills. In an interview with Erne at 61, the St. Petersburg Times quoted him as saying, "I didn't fight much after 1904, and I believe this kept me from following in the footsteps of so many boxers who try to hang on after their prime.  You see I was only 30 years old when I laid my gloves aside."

In 1997, he was among the first class inducted into Buffalo's Ring No. 44 Boxing Hall of Fame.

Professional boxing record

See also
Lineal championship

World titles won

|-

|-
|-

|-

References

External links
 

American male boxers
Featherweight boxers
Lightweight boxers
World boxing champions
World featherweight boxing champions
World lightweight boxing champions
1875 births
1954 deaths
Swiss emigrants to the United States